Habrok (Norse) – listed as the "best" hawk
 Hadhayosh (Persian) – gigantic land animal
 Hades (Greek) – Ruler of the Underworld
 Haetae (Korean) – dog-lion hybrid
 Hag (Many cultures worldwide) – wise old woman who is usually a malevolent spirit or a disguised goddess 
 Haietlik (Nuu-chah-nulth) – water serpent
 Hai-uri (Khoikhoi) – male cannibalistic partially invisible monster
 Hakutaku (Japanese) – talking beast which handed down knowledge on harmful spirits
 Hākuturi (Māori) – nature guardian
 Half-elf (Norse) – human-elf hybrid
 Haltija (Finnish) – spirit that protects a specific place
 Hamadryad (Greek) – oak tree nymph
 Hamingja (Scandinavian) – personal protection spirit
 Hamsa (Buddhist, Hindu and Jainism) – mystic bird
 Hanau epe (Rapa Nui) – long-eared humanoid
 Hantu Air (Malay) – shapeshifting water spirit
 Hantu Demon (Philippine) – demon
 Hantu Raya (Malay) – demonic servant
 Harionago (Japanese) – humanoid female with barbed, prehensile hair
 Harpy (Greek) – birdlike human-headed death spirit
 Haugbui (Norse) – undead being who cannot leave its burial mound
 Havsrå (Norse) – saltwater spirit
 Helloi (Meitei mythology) – celestial maidens, daughters of the Sky God Salailen
Headless Horseman (European) – humanoid spirit who haunts or kills
 Headless Mule (Brazilian) – fire-spewing, headless, spectral mule
 Hecatonchires (Greek) – primordial giants with 100 hands and fifty heads
 Heikegani (Japanese) – crabs with human-faced shells, the spirits of warriors killed in the Battle of Dan-no-ura
 Heinzelmännchen (German) – household spirit
 Helead (Greek) – fen nymph
 Hellhound (Many cultures worldwide) – underworld dog
 Heracles (Greek) – gatekeeper of Olympus
 Hercinia (Medieval Bestiaries) – glowing bird
 Herensuge (Basque) – dragon
 Hesperides (Greek) – nymph daughters of Atlas
 Hidebehind (United States) – nocturnal forest creature
 Hiderigami (Japanese) – drought spirit
 Hieracosphinx (Ancient Egypt) – falcon-headed sphinx
 Hihi (Japanese) – baboon monster
 Hiisi (Finnish) – nature guardian
 Hippalectryon (Greek) – a horse-rooster hybrid
 Hippocamp (Etruscan, Greek and Phoenician) – horse-fish hybrid
 Hippogriff (Medieval Bestiaries) – hybrid of a griffin and horse; a lion-eagle-horse hybrid
 Hippopodes (Medieval Bestiary) – horse-hoofed humanoid
 Hircocervus (Medieval Bestiary) – deer-goat hybrid
 Hitodama (Japanese) – ghosts of the newly dead, which take the form of fireballs
 Hitotsume-kozō (Japanese) – one-eyed childlike spirit
 Hob (English) – house spirit
 Hobbididance (English) – malevolent spirit
 Hobgoblin (Medieval) – friendly or amusing goblin
 Hodag (Native American) – frog-mammoth-lizard hybrid
 Hokhokw (Kwakiutl) – bird
 Hōkō (Japanese) – dog-like Chinese tree spirit 
 Homa (Persian) – eagle-lion hybrid, similar to a griffin
 Hombre Caiman (Colombian) – human-alligator hybrid
 Hombre Gato (Latin America) – human-cat hybrid
 Homunculus (Alchemy) – small animated construct
 Hō-ō (Japanese) – rooster-swallow-fowl-snake-goose-tortoise-stag-fish hybrid
 Hoopoe (multiple cultures) – near passerine bird common to Africa and Eurasia that features in many mythologies in those continents
 Hoop snake (United States, Canada, and Australia) – snake which rolls by taking its tail in its mouth
 Horned Serpent (Native American) – serpentine rain spirit
 Hotoke (Japanese) – deceased person
 Houri (Islamic) – heavenly beings
 Hraesvelg (Norse) – giant, who in eagle form, creates the wind by beating his wings
 Hrímþursar (Norse) – frost giants who are the main inhabitants of either Jotunheim or Niflheim
 Huaychivo (Mayan) – human-deer hybrid
 Huginn and Muninn (Norse) – pair of ravens associated with the Norse god Odin whose names mean Thought and Memory
 Huldufólk (Icelandic/Faroese) – secret mound/rock dwelling elves
 Hulder (Scandinavian) – forest spirit
 Huli jing (Chinese) – nine-tailed fox spirit
 Huma (Persian) – regenerative fire bird
 Humbaba (Akkadian) – lion-faced giant
 Hundun (Chinese) – chaos spirit
 Hupia (Taíno) – nocturnal ghost
 Hyakume (Japanese) – hundred-eyes creature
 Hydra (Greek) – multi-headed water serpent/dragon
 Hydrus (or Hydros) (Medieval Bestiary) – a water snake with various abilities
 Hyōsube (Japanese) – hair-covered kappa
 Hypnalis (Medieval Bestiary) – snake that kills its victims in their sleep
 Hudhud (mythology) (Islamic mythology) – a legendary hoopoe bird

H